Stefanie Joosten is a Dutch model, singer and actress living in Japan. She first gained widespread public attention when Japanese developer Konami revealed she would be providing the motion capture, voice and likeness for the character Quiet in the 2015 video game Metal Gear Solid V: The Phantom Pain.

Early life
Stefanie Joosten was born in Roermond, Limburg, in the southeastern Netherlands. She attended the Bisschoppelijk College Broekhin in Roermond, where she followed a bilingual (Dutch and English) course. After growing up obsessed with otaku culture, Joosten decided to study Japanese language and culture at Leiden University. In 2009, she went to Kyoto for a year as part of an exchange program. It was after this experience that she decided she would move to Tokyo after earning her degree back in the Netherlands.

Career
While in Japan, Joosten came into contact with several modeling agencies that happened to specifically seek Western models. She started doing modeling jobs in 2011. After doing numerous small acting roles and commercials, she got a call from a mystery agent who was looking for models to help with an undisclosed video game. Joosten, who had been into Japanese games since childhood, became suspicious when she recognized one of the people during the auditions. She later found out this was the famous video game developer Hideo Kojima, giving her an idea of what she had auditioned for. She was chosen as both the visual and voice model for Quiet, a central female character in the Metal Gear game Metal Gear Solid V: The Phantom Pain.

Joosten also sang the song "Quiet's Theme" from the game's original soundtrack.

Filmography

Video games

Feature films

Short films

Television

References

External links

 
 

Dutch Japanologists
Dutch female models
Dutch film actresses
Dutch television actresses
Dutch voice actresses
Living people
People from Roermond
Dutch expatriates in Japan
Dutch video game actresses
21st-century Dutch actresses
Women orientalists
Year of birth missing (living people)